The Karlinbach is a stream in South Tyrol, Italy, that it is sourced from the Weißkugel mountain in the Ötztal Alps mountain range. It flows in the Lake Reschen, near the village of Graun im Vinschgau.

References 
Civic Network of South Tyrol (in German).

Rivers of Italy
Rivers of South Tyrol